Mujer Secreta (English title:Secret woman) is a Venezuelan telenovela written by Alidha Ávila and produced by Radio Caracas Televisión in 1999. This telenovela lasted 126 episodes and was distributed internationally by RCTV International.

Carolina Tejera and Juan Carlos Vivas starred as the main protagonists with Mariano Álvarez and Alba Roversi as the antagonists.

Synopsis
Eugenia is a beautiful and gentle woman trapped in an abusive marriage to her husband Gustavo Landaeta. She struggles to find herself, love and happiness as she debates whether to leave her husband or not as she blames herself for her husband's failures even though she knows that his mother Carlota who had a role to play in his current brutal behaviour and insecurities. Eugenia fears leaving Gustavo and being free to end up trapped in another prison. But her destiny changes when she meets Bernardo Valladares, Gustavo's cousin and one of the heirs to the Valladares group of banks. Eugenia feels safe and secure in Bernardo's arms and is able to forget her troubles. Although they love each other, they know  their love is impossible due to Gustavo's emotional instability and ruinous ambition, and José Manuel, Bernardo's father who is also secretly in love with Eugenia and desires to make her his wife.

Cast

References

External links
 Mujer Secreta at the Internet Movie Database
 Opening Credits

1999 telenovelas
RCTV telenovelas
Venezuelan telenovelas
1999 Venezuelan television series debuts
1999 Venezuelan television series endings
Spanish-language telenovelas
Television shows set in Caracas